A three-minute pop song is a cliché that describes the archetype of popular music, based on the average running-length of a typical single. The root of the "three-minute" length is likely derived from the original format of 78 rpm-speed phonograph records; at about 3 to 5 minutes per side, it's just long enough for the recording of a complete song.

The rules of the Eurovision Song Contest do not permit entries to be longer than three minutes.

See also
 Single (music), section "Early history"
 Phonograph record, section "78 rpm recording time"
 Phonograph cylinder, section "Early development"

References

Pop music
Popular music
Singles (music)
Song forms